Papilio lamarchei is a species of swallowtail butterfly from the genus Papilio that is found from Argentina to Bolivia.

Description
The yellow band narrower than in Papilio himeros, forewing without yellow spot distally of the anterior angle of the cell; hindwing very strongly dentate, tail without yellow spot at the tip. Harpe short and rounded, whilst in himeros it is long and pointed.

References

lamarchei
Butterflies described in 1892
Papilionidae of South America